is a former Japanese football player.

Playing career
Arai was born in Tobetsu, Hokkaido on December 22, 1983. He joined the J1 League club Consadole Sapporo from his youth team in 2002. He debuted in April and played several matches as forward in 2002. However Consadole finished in last place in the 2002 season and was relegated to the J2 League. He played many matches as substitute forward in 2003. However he was arrested, along with teammate Koji Nakao, for driving under the influence and was dismissed with Nakao in August. In October 2004, he joined the Regional Leagues club Shizuoka FC. In 2005, he moved to the J2 club Sagan Tosu. He became a regular forward and became a top scorer in 2005 and 2006. In 2007, he moved to the J1 club JEF United Chiba. He played often over three seasons. However did not score many goals and JEF United was relegated to the J2 league at the end of the 2009 season. In 2010, he moved to the newly promoted J1 club, Shonan Bellmare. In 2011, he moved to the J2 club Sagan Tosu for the first time in five years. He retired at the end of the 2011 season.

Club statistics

References

External links

1983 births
Living people
Association football people from Hokkaido
Japanese footballers
J1 League players
J2 League players
Hokkaido Consadole Sapporo players
Sagan Tosu players
JEF United Chiba players
Shonan Bellmare players
Association football forwards